Pyrrosia rupestris known as the rock felt fern is a common fern of eastern Australia. Occurring as an epiphyte or lithophyte in areas of part shade and high moisture. Usually found in rainforest or moist eucalyptus forest. Often seen on rainforest trees, quite high above the ground. However, it grows as far west at the more arid Warrumbungle National Park. In drought it shrinks and becomes desiccated. With rain or mist the fern recovers well.

The name Pyrrosia is from the Greek which refers to the flame colour of the hairs that cover the fronds on some species. Rupestris means growing near rocks. Rock felt fern grows from Victoria north through New South Wales and Queensland to New Guinea.

Description 
Leaves are round or tongue like in shape. 2 cm round, or up to 10 cm long and 1.5 cm broad. Sterile leaves round, fertile leaves long and tongue shaped. Round dark sori (spores) seen under the long leaves. Rhizomes orange brown in colour, long and creeping. Able to grasp onto rocks or tree trunks.

References 
 
 http://www.yarraranges.vic.gov.au/Directory/S2_Item.asp?Mkey=1002&S3Key=42
 https://web.archive.org/web/20091005150644/http://www.rbgsyd.nsw.gov.au/welcome_to_bgt/mount_tomah_botanic_garden/the_garden/blooming_calendar/Pyrrosia_rupestris

Polypodiaceae
Ferns of Australia
Flora of New South Wales
Flora of Queensland
Flora of Victoria (Australia)
Flora of New Guinea
Epiphytes